The Earthling Tour was a concert tour by British musician David Bowie, in promotion of his album Earthling, released in 1997, The tour started on 7 June 1997 at Flughafen Blankensee in Lübeck, Germany, continuing through Europe, North America before reaching a conclusion in Buenos Aires, Argentina on 7 November 1997.

History
Bowie first publicly performed Earthling material in late 1996, playing "Telling Lies" and sometimes "Little Wonder" at shows on the US East Coast in September and October. On 9 January 1997, the day after he turned 50, Bowie held a 50th birthday concert for himself, performing tracks off the album, as well as a selection of songs from his back catalogue. He played to nearly 15,000 fans at New York's Madison Square Garden. Bowie was joined onstage by artists including Billy Corgan, Foo Fighters, Sonic Youth, Black Francis, Robert Smith and Lou Reed, to perform many of his songs. Other non-performing guests included Beck, Moby, Julian Schnabel, Prince, Charlie Sexton, Fred Schneider, Christopher Walken, Matt Dillon and Bowie's wife Iman. Artist Tony Oursler designed some of the artwork for the video backdrop that played behind the band onstage. The event was recorded for a pay-per-view special commemorating the event, and a portion of the proceeds from the event were donated to the charity Save the Children. Tim Pope, who had previously worked with Bowie directing his 1987 video for "Time Will Crawl", directed the 50th Anniversary video, and Duncan Jones, Bowie's son, was one of the camera operators at the event. A month later, Earthling was released and Bowie promoted it with appearances on Saturday Night Live (8 February) and The Tonight Show (11 February). The Pay-Per-View broadcast of the birthday concert followed on 8 March.

Bowie and his band began rehearsing for the tour in April 1997, and expected the tour to last "from May through Christmas" (1997). Bowie predicted a "really extensive, a long, long tour". During rehearsals for the tour, Bowie re-recorded updated studio versions of some of his older songs, including "The Man Who Sold the World" and "Stay". These updated versions were performed during the tour, though the latter wouldn't be officially released until 2020 as part of the EP Is It Any Wonder?

The original concept was to perform two sets: one regular and one dance-oriented, incorporating drum and bass. This idea was abandoned, owing to the antipathy of critics and audiences. After the performance at the Muziekcentrum Vredenburg in Utrecht, on 11 June 1997, elements of each were incorporated into one set.

"He hated playing things just like the record," recalled guitarist Reeves Gabrels. "He wanted me to dress songs up in the clothes we're wearing now."

The 14 October 1997 show at the Capitol Theatre in Port Chester, New York – broadcast on MTV's Live from the 10 Spot – was added at short notice due to cancellation by The Rolling Stones. The following show on 15 October 1997 at the Radio City Music Hall in New York City, New York was part of the GQ Awards.

The setlist included Laurie Anderson's "O Superman" (from Big Science (1982)) with lead vocals by Gail Ann Dorsey.

Tour publicist Tony Michaelides handled press, radio & television for Bowie.

A live album from the European leg of the tour made it to the mixing stage- Bowie, Gabrels and Mark Plati were all involved- but Virgin, the band's label, cancelled the release. The release was eventually made available, albeit with a different track listing than originally envisioned, to BowieNet subscribers as the release LiveAndWell.com, which was re-released in 2021.

Tao Jones Index

Bowie and the band performed a small number of "secret" shows under the name "Tao Jones Index", deliberately playing without people knowing who they were. "Tao Jones Index" was a pun based on Bowie's real name, David Jones, and the 1997 Bowie Bond issue (Tao is pronounced "Dow", as in Dow Jones Index from the US stock market). According to Gabrels, drummer Zachary Alford likely came up with the name, and they only played as Tao Jones Index "a half dozen [times] or fewer", eventually wearying of the project as fans began to recognize Bowie and call out for him to play his hits. The sets were, according to Gabrels, less strictly drum and bass so much as "dance remixes": "We were inspired by the various remixes of Earthling songs to reclaim & remake them as a live band." The band played their normal instruments, but without amplifiers, and Alford played electronic drums. There was only one official release from any of the Tao Jones Index's performances: a 12" single of "Pallas Athena" and "V-2 Schneider" (1997).

One live performance was 10 June 1997, from which the live versions of "Pallas Athena" and "V2-Schneider" were recorded; another live performance was on 19 July 1997 Phoenix Festival; their performance in the BBC Radio 1 dance tent preceded the regular performance on the main stage the following day.

Look at the Moon! (Live Phoenix Festival 97)

The band's performance on 20 July 1997, recorded at Long Marston, England during the Phoenix Festival, was released in a live album entitled Look at the Moon! in February 2021. The concert was released in two limited editions: a 2 CD-set or a 3-LP set. This live album was the fourth in the 6-concert series Brilliant Live Adventures. Look at the Moon! reached number 16 on the UK albums chart, and number 92 in Ireland.

Look at the Moon setlist
"Quicksand"
"The Man Who Sold the World"
"Driftin' Blues"/"The Jean Genie"
"I'm Afraid of Americans"
"Battle for Britain (The Letter)"
"Fashion"
"Seven Years in Tibet"
"Fame"
"Looking for Satellites"
"Under Pressure"
"The Hearts Filthy Lesson"
"Scary Monsters (And Super Creeps)"
"Hallo Spaceboy"
"Little Wonder"
"Dead Man Walking"
"White Light/White Heat"
"O Superman"
"Stay"

Tour band
David Bowie  – vocals, guitar, alto & baritone saxophone
Reeves Gabrels  – guitar, backing vocals
Gail Ann Dorsey  – bass guitar, vocals, keyboards
Zack Alford – drums, percussion 
Mike Garson  – keyboards, backing vocals

Tour dates

Notes

Songs

From Space Oddity
"Space Oddity"
From The Man Who Sold the World
 "The Man Who Sold the World"
 "The Supermen"
From Hunky Dory
 "Quicksand"
 "Queen Bitch"
From The Rise and Fall of Ziggy Stardust and the Spiders from Mars
 "Moonage Daydream"
"Lady Stardust"
From Aladdin Sane
"Aladdin Sane (1913-1938-197?)"
 "Panic in Detroit"
 "The Jean Genie"
From Live Santa Monica '72
 "My Death" (originally from La Valse à Mille Temps (1959) by Jacques Brel; written by Brel & Mort Shuman)
 "I'm Waiting for the Man" (originally from The Velvet Underground & Nico (1967) by The Velvet Underground and Nico, written by Lou Reed; outtake from various Bowie sessions 1966-72)
From Ziggy Stardust: The Motion Picture
 "White Light/White Heat" (originally from White Light/White Heat (1968) by The Velvet Underground; written by Lou Reed)
From Young Americans
 "Fame" (Bowie, John Lennon, Carlos Alomar)
From Station to Station
 "Stay"
From Low
 "Always Crashing in the Same Car"
From "Heroes"
 ""Heroes"" (Bowie, Brian Eno)
 "V-2 Schneider"
From Lodger
 "Look Back in Anger" (Bowie, Eno)
From Scary Monsters (and Super Creeps)
"Ashes To Ashes"
 "Scary Monsters (and Super Creeps)"
 "Fashion"
From Let's Dance
"Let's Dance"
"China Girl"
From Tin Machine
 "I Can't Read" (Bowie, Reeves Gabrels)
From Black Tie White Noise
 "Pallas Athena" (Tao Jones Index version)
From Outside
 "Outside" (Bowie, Kevin Armstrong)
 "The Hearts Filthy Lesson" (Bowie, Eno, Gabrels, Mike Garson, Erdal Kızılçay, Sterling Campbell)
 "Hallo Spaceboy" (Bowie, Eno)
 "The Motel" (Bowie, Eno)
 "The Voyeur of Utter Destruction (as Beauty)" (Bowie, Eno, Gabrels)
 "I'm Deranged" (Bowie, Eno)
 "Strangers When We Meet"
From Earthling
 "Little Wonder" (Bowie, Gabrels, Mark Plati)
 "Looking for Satellites" (Bowie, Gabrels, Plati)
 "Battle for Britain (The Letter)" (Bowie, Gabrels, Plati)
 "Seven Years in Tibet" (Bowie, Gabrels)
 "Dead Man Walking" (Bowie, Gabrels)
 "Dead Man Walking (Moby Mix)" (Bowie, Gabrels)
 "Telling Lies"
 "The Last Thing You Should Do" (Bowie, Gabrels, Plati)
 "I'm Afraid of Americans" (Bowie, Eno)
Other songs:
 "Can't Help Thinking About Me" (early non-album single (1966))
 "All the Young Dudes" (from All the Young Dudes (1972) by Mott the Hoople; written by Bowie)
 "Under Pressure" (originally a single (1981) by Bowie and Queen later found on Hot Space the following year; written by Bowie, John Deacon, Brian May, Freddie Mercury, Roger Taylor)
 "Volare (Nel Blu Dipinto Di Blu)" (a single by Domenico Modugno, Bowie cover on Absolute Beginners; written by Modugno and Franco Migliacci)
 "Is It Any Wonder?" (Instrumental jam based on "Fame", reworked as "Fun" for a BowieNet release)
 "O Superman (For Massenet)" (from Big Science (1982) by Laurie Anderson; written by Anderson)

References

References
 David Buckley, Strange Fascination: The Definitive Biography of David Bowie, Virgin Books, 1999, 

David Bowie concert tours
1997 concert tours